Michael Stark is an actor.

Michael Stark may also refer to:

 Michael Stark, who was among the first to enter a same-sex marriage in Canada, see The Michaels
 Mike Stark, American blogger and activist

See also
Michael Starke, British actor
 Mike Starkie, British Conservative politician